The VUB night frog (Nyctibatrachus vrijeuni) is a species of frogs in the family Nyctibatrachidae. Both the specific name, "vrijeuni", and the acronym in the common name, "VUB", refer to Vrije Universiteit Brussel, the Free University of Brussels. It is one of 12 new species of frogs in the genus Nyctibatrachus discovered in September 2011. It is found exclusively in the Western Ghats, India.

References

Nyctibatrachus
Endemic fauna of the Western Ghats
Frogs of India
Amphibians described in 2011
Taxa named by Sathyabhama Das Biju